The Cattamarra Coal Measures is an Early Jurassic geological unit in Western Australia.

Description 
They are part of the Perth Basin, and are a sequence of non-marine, probably fluvial sandstones, shales and silts including bituminous coal, and are up to 300 m thick. The Cattamarra Coal Measures conformably overly the Eneabba Formation.

The Cattamarra Coal Measures constitute an unconventional tight gas reservoir.

There are well preserved fossil insects from the Jurassic age in the deposit.

See also 
 Toarcian turnover
 Toarcian formations
Marne di Monte Serrone, Italy
 Calcare di Sogno, Italy
 Sachrang Formation, Austria
 Posidonia Shale, Lagerstätte in Germany
 Ciechocinek Formation, Germany and Poland
 Krempachy Marl Formation, Poland and Slovakia
 Lava Formation, Lithuania
 Azilal Group, North Africa
 Whitby Mudstone, England
 Fernie Formation, Alberta and British Columbia
 Poker Chip Shale
 Whiteaves Formation, British Columbia
 Navajo Sandstone, Utah
 Los Molles Formation, Argentina
 Mawson Formation, Antarctica
 Kandreho Formation, Madagascar
 Kota Formation, India
 Unconventional (oil & gas) reservoir

References

Further reading 
 
 Stratigraphy and petroleum systems elements of the northern Perth Basin
 S. K. Martin. 2010. Early Jurassic cockroaches (Blattodea) from the Mintaja insect locality, Western Australia. Alavesia 3:55–72
 S. K. Martin. 2008. A new protorhyphid fly (Insecta: Diptera: Protorhyphidae) from the Lower Jurassic of the Perth Basin, Western Australia. Alavesia 2:253–257

Geologic formations of Australia
Jurassic System of Australia
Aalenian Stage
Pliensbachian Stage
Toarcian Stage
Sandstone formations
Fluvial deposits
Reservoir rock formations
Source rock formations
Coal formations
Coal in Australia
Paleontology in Australia
Geology of Western Australia